William Frank Buckley Jr. (born William Francis Buckley; November 24, 1925 – February 27, 2008) was an American conservative writer, public intellectual, and political commentator. In 1955, he founded National Review, the magazine that stimulated the conservative movement in the mid-20th century United States. Buckley hosted 1,429 episodes of the public affairs television show Firing Line (1966–1999), the longest-running public affairs show with a single host in American television history, where he became known for his distinctive Mid-Atlantic accent and wide vocabulary.

Born in New York City, Buckley served stateside in the United States Army during the Second World War. After the war, he attended Yale University, where he engaged in debate and right-wing political commentary. Afterward, he worked for two years in the Central Intelligence Agency. In addition to editorials in National Review, Buckley wrote God and Man at Yale (1951) and more than fifty other books on diverse topics, including writing, speaking, history, politics, and sailing. His works include a series of novels featuring fictitious CIA agent Blackford Oakes as well as a nationally syndicated newspaper column.

Buckley called himself both a conservative and a libertarian. George H. Nash, a historian of the modern American conservative movement, said in 2008 that Buckley was "arguably the most important public intellectual in the United States in the past half century. For an entire generation, he was the preeminent voice of American conservatism and its first great ecumenical figure." Conversely, political consultant Stuart Stevens, who served as a top strategist on Mitt Romney's 2012 presidential campaign and later as a leading figure with The Lincoln Project, writes that "for all his well-crafted sentences and love of language, Buckley was often a more articulate version of the same deep ugliness and bigotry that is the hallmark of Trumpism."

Early life

Buckley was born November 24, 1925, in New York City, to Aloise Josephine Antonia (Steiner) and William Frank Buckley Sr., a Texas-born lawyer and oil developer. His mother, from New Orleans, was of Swiss-German, German, and Irish descent, while his paternal grandparents, from Hamilton, Ontario, Canada, were of Irish ancestry. The sixth of ten children, Buckley moved as a boy with his family to Mexico, and then to Sharon, Connecticut, before beginning his formal schooling in Paris, where he attended first grade. By age seven, he received his first formal training in English at a day school in London; his first and second languages were Spanish and French. As a boy, Buckley developed a love for music, sailing, horses, hunting, and skiing, all interests reflected in his later writings. He was homeschooled through the eighth grade using the Calvert School of Baltimore's Homeschool Curriculum. Just before World War II, at age 12–13, he attended the Jesuit preparatory school St John's Beaumont in England.

Buckley's father, William Sr. (1881–1958), was an American oil developer whose wealth was based in Mexico. The elder Buckley became influential in Mexican politics during the military dictatorship of Victoriano Huerta but was expelled when leftist general Álvaro Obregón became president in 1920. The younger Buckley had nine siblings, including eldest sister Aloise Buckley Heath, a writer and conservative activist; sister Maureen Buckley-O'Reilly (1933–1964), who married Gerald A. O'Reilly, CEO of Richardson-Vicks Drugs; sister Priscilla Buckley, author of Living It Up with National Review: A Memoir, for which William wrote the foreword; sister Patricia Buckley Bozell, who was Patricia Taylor's roommate at Vassar before each married; brother Reid Buckley, an author, debate-master, and founder of the Buckley School of Public Speaking; and brother James L. Buckley, who became a U.S. Senator from New York and was later a judge of the United States Court of Appeals for the D.C. Circuit.

During the war, Buckley's family took in the future British historian Alistair Horne (son of Sir Allan Horne) as a child war evacuee. He and Buckley remained lifelong friends. They both attended the Millbrook School in Millbrook, New York, graduating in 1943. Buckley was a member of the American Boys' Club for the Defense of Errol Flynn (ABCDEF) during Flynn's trial for statutory rape in 1943. At Millbrook, Buckley founded and edited the school's yearbook, The Tamarack; this was his first experience in publishing. When Buckley was a young man, libertarian author Albert Jay Nock was a frequent guest at the Buckley family house in Sharon, Connecticut. William F. Buckley Sr. urged his son to read Nock's works, the best-known of which was Our Enemy, the State, in which Nock maintained that the founding fathers of the United States, at their Constitutional Convention in 1787, had executed a coup d'état of the system of government established under the Articles of Confederation.

Music

In his youth, Buckley developed many musical talents. He played the harpsichord very well, later calling it "the instrument I love beyond all others", although he admitted he was not "proficient enough to develop [his] own style". He was a close friend of harpsichordist Fernando Valenti, who offered to sell Buckley his sixteen-foot pitch harpsichord. Buckley was also an accomplished pianist and appeared once on Marian McPartland's National Public Radio show Piano Jazz. A great admirer of Johann Sebastian Bach, Buckley wanted Bach's music played at his funeral.

Religion
Buckley was raised a Catholic and was a member of the Knights of Malta. He described his faith by saying, "I grew up, as reported, in a large family of Catholics without even a decent ration of tentativeness among the lot of us about our religious faith." When he attended Millbrook School, Buckley was permitted to attend Catholic Mass at a nearby church despite the school's Protestant affiliation. As a youth, he became aware of a perceived anti-Catholic bias in the United States through reading American Freedom and Catholic Power, a Paul Blanshard book that accused American Catholics of having "divided loyalties".

The release of his first book, God and Man at Yale, in 1951 was met with some specific criticism pertaining to his Catholicism. McGeorge Bundy, dean of Harvard at the time, wrote in The Atlantic that "it seems strange for any Roman Catholic to undertake to speak for the Yale religious tradition". Henry Sloane Coffin, a Yale trustee, accused Buckley's book of "being distorted by his Roman Catholic point of view" and stated that Buckley "should have attended Fordham or some similar institution".

In his 1997 book Nearer, My God, Buckley condemned what he viewed as "the Supreme Court's war against religion in the public school" and argued that Christian faith was being replaced by "another God ... multiculturalism". As an adult, Buckley regularly attended the Tridentine Mass in Connecticut. He disapproved of the liturgical reforms following the Second Vatican Council. Buckley also revealed an interest in the writings and revelations of the 20th Century Italian writer Maria Valtorta. In his spiritual memoir, Buckley reproduced Valtorta's detailed accounts of Jesus Christ's crucifixion; these accounts were based on Valtorta's visionary experiences of Christ and the mystical revelations she recorded in her book The Poem of the Man-God.

Education and military service
Buckley attended the National Autonomous University of Mexico (or UNAM) until 1943. The next year, upon his graduation from the U.S. Army Officer Candidate School (OCS), he was commissioned as a second lieutenant in the United States Army. In his book Miles Gone By, he briefly recounts being a member of Franklin Roosevelt's honor guard upon Roosevelt's death. He served stateside throughout the war at Fort Benning, Georgia; Fort Gordon, Georgia; and Fort Sam Houston, Texas. After the war ended in 1945, Buckley enrolled at Yale University, where he became a member of the secret Skull and Bones society and was a masterful debater. He was an active member of the Conservative Party of the Yale Political Union, and served as chairman of the Yale Daily News and as an informer for the FBI. At Yale, Buckley studied political science, history, and economics and graduated with honors in 1950. He excelled on the Yale Debate Team; under the tutelage of Yale professor Rollin G. Osterweis, Buckley honed his acerbic style.

Central Intelligence Agency 
Buckley remained at Yale working as a Spanish instructor from 1947 to 1951 before being recruited into the CIA like many other Ivy League alumni at that time; he served for two years, including one year in Mexico City working on political action for E. Howard Hunt, who was later imprisoned for his part in the Watergate scandal. The two officers remained lifelong friends. In a November 1, 2005, column for National Review, Buckley recounted that while he worked for the CIA, the only CIA employee he knew was Hunt, his immediate boss. While stationed in Mexico, Buckley edited The Road to Yenan, a book by Peruvian author Eudocio Ravines. After leaving the CIA, he worked as an editor at The American Mercury in 1952, but left after perceiving newly emerging anti-Semitic tendencies in the magazine.

Marriage and family
In 1950, Buckley married Patricia Aldyen Austin (Pat) Taylor (1926–2007), daughter of Canadian industrialist Austin C. Taylor. He met Taylor, a Protestant from Vancouver, British Columbia, while she was a student at Vassar College. She later became a prominent fundraiser for such charitable organizations as the Memorial Sloan Kettering Cancer Center, the Institute of Reconstructive Plastic Surgery at New York University Medical Center, and the Hospital for Special Surgery. She also raised money for Vietnam War veterans. On April 15, 2007, Pat Buckley died at age 80 of an infection after a long illness. After her death, Buckley seemed "dejected and rudderless", according to friend Christopher Little.

William and Patricia Buckley had one son, author Christopher Buckley. They lived at Wallack's Point in Stamford, Connecticut, with a Manhattan duplex apartment at 73 East 73rd Street: a private entrance to 778 Park Avenue in Manhattan.

Beginning in 1970, Buckley and his wife lived and worked in Rougemont, Switzerland for six to seven weeks per year for more than three decades.

First books

God and Man at Yale

Buckley's first book, God and Man at Yale, was published in 1951. Offering a critique of Yale University, Buckley argued in the book that the school had strayed from its original mission. One critic viewed the work as miscasting the role of academic freedom. The American academic and commentator McGeorge Bundy, a Yale graduate himself, wrote in The Atlantic: "God and Man at Yale, written by William F. Buckley, Jr., is a savage attack on that institution as a hotbed of 'atheism' and 'collectivism.' I find the book is dishonest in its use of facts, false in its theory, and a discredit to its author."

Buckley himself credited the attention the book received to its "Introduction" by John Chamberlain, saying that it "chang[ed] the course of his life" and that the famous Life magazine editorial writer had acted out of "reckless generosity". Buckley was referred to in Richard Condon's 1959 novel The Manchurian Candidate as "that fascinating younger fellow who had written about men and God at Yale."

McCarthy and His Enemies
In 1954, Buckley and his brother-in-law L. Brent Bozell Jr. co-authored a book, McCarthy and His Enemies. Bozell worked with Buckley at The American Mercury in the early 1950s when it was edited by William Bradford Huie. The book defended Senator Joseph McCarthy as a patriotic crusader against communism, and asserted that "McCarthyism ... is a movement around which men of good will and stern morality can close ranks." Buckley and Bozell described McCarthy as responding to a communist "ambition to occupy the world". They conceded that he was often "guilty of exaggeration" but believed the cause he pursued was just.

National Review
Buckley founded National Review in 1955 at a time when there were few publications devoted to conservative commentary. He served as the magazine's editor-in-chief until 1990. During that time, National Review became the standard-bearer of American conservatism, promoting the fusionism of traditional conservatives and libertarians. Examining postwar conservative intellectual history, Kim Phillips-Fein writes:

Buckley sought out intellectuals who were ex-Communists or had once worked on the far Left, including Whittaker Chambers, Willi Schlamm, John Dos Passos, Frank Meyer and James Burnham, as editors and writers for National Review. When Burnham became a senior editor, he urged the adoption of a more pragmatic editorial position that would extend the influence of the magazine toward the political center. Smant (1991) finds that Burnham overcame sometimes heated opposition from other members of the editorial board (including Meyer, Schlamm, William Rickenbacker, and the magazine's publisher, William A. Rusher), and had a significant impact on both the editorial policy of the magazine and on the thinking of Buckley himself.

Defining the boundaries of conservatism

Buckley and his editors used National Review to define the boundaries of conservatism and to exclude people, ideas, or groups they considered unworthy of the conservative title. For example, Buckley denounced Ayn Rand, the John Birch Society, George Wallace, racists, white supremacists, and anti-Semites.

When he first met author Ayn Rand, according to Buckley, she greeted him with the following: "You are much too intelligent to believe in God." In turn, Buckley felt that "Rand's style, as well as her message, clashed with the conservative ethos". He decided that Rand's hostility to religion made her philosophy unacceptable to his understanding of conservatism. After 1957, he attempted to weed her out of the conservative movement by publishing Whittaker Chambers's highly negative review of Rand's Atlas Shrugged. In 1964, he wrote of "her desiccated philosophy's conclusive incompatibility with the conservative's emphasis on transcendence, intellectual and moral", as well as "the incongruity of tone, that hard, schematic, implacable, unyielding, dogmatism that is in itself intrinsically objectionable, whether it comes from the mouth of Ehrenburg, Savonarola—or Ayn Rand." Other attacks on Rand were penned by Garry Wills and M. Stanton Evans. Nevertheless, Burns argues, her popularity and her influence on the right forced Buckley and his circle into a reconsideration of how traditional notions of virtue and Christianity could be integrated with all-out support for capitalism.

In 1962, Buckley denounced Robert W. Welch Jr. and the John Birch Society in National Review as "far removed from common sense" and urged the Republican Party to purge itself of Welch's influence. He hedged the statement by insisting that among them were "some of the most morally energetic, self-sacrificing, and dedicated anti-Communists in America."

On Robert Welch and the John Birch Society 
In 1952, their mutual publisher Henry Regnery introduced Buckley to Robert Welch. Both Buckley and Welch became editors of political journals, and both had a knack for communication and organization. Welch launched his publication One Man's Opinion in 1956 (renamed American Opinion in 1958), one year after the founding of The National Review. Welch twice donated $1,000 to Buckley's magazine, and Buckley offered to provide Welch "a little publicity" for his publication. Both believed that the United States suffered from diplomatic and military setbacks during the early years of the Cold War, and both were staunchly anti-communist. But Welch expressed doubts about Eisenhower's loyalties in 1957, and the two disagreed on the reasons for the United States' perceived failure in the Cold War's early years. According to Alvin Felzenberg's assessment, the disagreements between the two blossomed into "a major battle" in 1958. That year, Boris Pasternak won the Nobel Prize in Literature for his novel Doctor Zhivago. Buckley was impressed by the novel's vivid and depressing depictions of life in a communist society, and believed that the CIA's smuggling of the novel into the Soviet Union was an ideological victory. In September 1958, Buckley ran a review of Doctor Zhivago by John Chamberlain. In November 1958, Welch sent Buckley and other associates copies of his unpublished manuscript "The Politician", which accused Eisenhower and several of Eisenhower's appointees of involvement in a communist conspiracy. When Buckley returned the manuscript to Welch, he commented that the allegations were "curiously—almost pathetically optimistic." On December 9, 1958, Welch founded the John Birch Society with a group of business leaders in Indianapolis. By the end of 1958, Welch had both the organizational and the editorial infrastructure to launch his subsequent far-right political advocacy campaigns.

In 1961, reflecting on his correspondences with Welch and Birchers, Buckley told someone who subscribed to both the National Review and the John Birch Society: "I have had more discussions about the John Birch Society in the past year than I have about the existence of God or the financial difficulties of National Review."

Buckley rule
The Buckley rule states that National Review "will support the rightwardmost viable candidate" for a given office. Buckley first stated the Buckley rule during the 1964 Republican primary election featuring Barry Goldwater and Nelson Rockefeller. The rule is often misquoted and misapplied as proclaiming support for "the rightwardmost electable candidate", or simply the most electable candidate.

According to National Reviews Neal B. Freeman, the Buckley rule meant that National Review would support "somebody who saw the world as we did. Somebody who would bring credit to our cause. Somebody who, win or lose, would conservatize the Republican party and the country. It meant somebody like Barry Goldwater."

Starr Broadcasting Group 
Buckley was the chairman of Starr Broadcasting Group, a company in which he owned a 20% stake. Peter Starr was president of the company and his brother Michael Starr was executive vice president. In February 1979 the U.S. Securities and Exchange Commission accused Buckley and 10 other defendants of defrauding shareholders in Starr Broadcasting Group. As part of a settlement, Buckley agreed to return $1.4 million in stock and cash to shareholders in the company. The other defendants were ordered to contribute $360,000. In 1981, there was another agreement with the SEC.

Political commentary and action

Broadcasts and publications

Buckley's column On the Right was syndicated by Universal Press Syndicate beginning in 1962. From the early 1970s, his twice-weekly column was distributed regularly to more than 320 newspapers across the country. He authored 5,600 editions of the column, which totaled to over 4.5 million words.

For many Americans, Buckley's erudition on his weekly PBS show Firing Line (1966–1999) was their primary exposure to him and his manner of speech, often with vocabulary common in academia but unusual on television.

Throughout his career as a media figure, Buckley had received much criticism—largely from the American left, but also from certain factions on the right, such as the John Birch Society and its second president, Larry McDonald, as well as from Objectivists.

In 1953–54, long before he founded Firing Line, Buckley was an occasional panelist on the conservative public affairs program Answers for Americans broadcast on ABC and based on material from the H. L. Hunt–supported publication Facts Forum.

Young Americans for Freedom

In 1960, Buckley helped form Young Americans for Freedom (YAF). The YAF was guided by principles Buckley called "The Sharon Statement". Buckley was proud of the successful campaign of his older brother, Jim Buckley, on the Conservative Party ticket to capture the US Senate seat from New York State held by incumbent Republican Charles Goodell in 1970, giving very generous credit to the activist support of the New York State chapter of YAF. Buckley served one term in the Senate, then was defeated by Democrat Daniel Patrick Moynihan in 1976.

Edgar Smith murder case
In 1962, Edgar Smith, who had been sentenced to death for the murder of 15-year-old high-school student Victoria Ann Zielinski in New Jersey, began a correspondence with Buckley from death row. As a result of the correspondence, Buckley began to doubt Smith's guilt. Buckley later said the case against Smith was "inherently implausible". An article by Buckley about the case, published in Esquire in November 1965, drew national media attention:

Buckley's article brought renewed media interest in Hommell, who Smith claimed was the real killer. In 1971, there was a retrial. Smith took a plea deal, and was freed from prison that year. Buckley interviewed him on Firing Line soon thereafter.

In 1976, five years after being released from prison, Smith attempted to murder another woman, this time in San Diego, California. After witnesses corroborated the story of Lisa Ozbun, who survived being stabbed by Smith, he was sentenced to life in prison. He admitted at the trial that he had in fact also murdered Zielinski. Buckley subsequently expressed great regret at having believed Smith and supported him. Friends of Buckley said he was devastated and blamed himself for what happened.

Mayoral candidacy
In 1965, Buckley ran for mayor of New York City as the candidate for the new Conservative Party. He ran to restore momentum to the conservative cause in the wake of Goldwater's defeat. He tried to take votes away from the relatively liberal Republican candidate and fellow Yale alumnus John Lindsay, who later became a Democrat. Buckley did not expect to win; when asked what he would do if he won the race, he responded, "Demand a recount." He used an unusual campaign style. During one televised debate with Lindsay, Buckley declined to use his allotted rebuttal time and instead replied, "I am satisfied to sit back and contemplate my own former eloquence."

To relieve traffic congestion, Buckley proposed charging drivers a fee to enter the central city and creating a network of bike lanes. He opposed a civilian review board for the New York Police Department, which Lindsay had recently introduced to control police corruption and install community policing. Buckley finished third with 13.4% of the vote, possibly having inadvertently aided Lindsay's election by instead taking votes from Democratic candidate Abe Beame.

Feud with Gore Vidal
When asked if there was one person with whom Buckley would not share a stage, Buckley's response was Gore Vidal. Likewise, Vidal's antagonism toward Buckley was well known, even before 1968. Buckley nevertheless appeared in a series of televised debates with Vidal during the 1968 Republican National Convention in Miami and the Democratic National Convention in Chicago.

In their penultimate debate on August 28 of that year, the two disagreed over the actions of the Chicago Police Department and the protesters at the convention. In reference to the response of the police involved in supposedly taking down a Viet Cong flag, moderator Howard K. Smith asked whether raising a Nazi flag during the Second World War would have elicited a similar response. Vidal responded that people were free to state their political views as they saw fit, whereupon Buckley interrupted and noted that people were free to speak their views but others were also free to ostracize them for holding those views, noting that in the US during the Second World War "some people were pro-Nazi and they were well [i.e. correctly] treated by those who ostracized them—and I'm for ostracizing people who egg on other people to shoot American Marines and American soldiers. I know you [Vidal] don't care because you have no sense of identification with—". Vidal then interjected that "the only sort of pro- or crypto-Nazi I can think of is yourself" whereupon Smith interjected, "Now let's not call names". Buckley, visibly angered, rose several inches from his seat and replied, "Now listen, you queer, stop calling me a crypto-Nazi or I'll sock you in your goddamn face, and you'll stay plastered."

Buckley later apologized in print for having called Vidal a "queer" in a burst of anger rather than in a clinical context but also reiterated his distaste for Vidal as an "evangelist for bisexuality": "The man who in his essays proclaims the normalcy of his affliction, and in his art the desirability of it, is not to be confused with the man who bears his sorrow quietly. The addict is to be pitied and even respected, not the pusher." The debates are chronicled in the 2015 documentary Best of Enemies.

This feud continued the next year in Esquire magazine, which commissioned essays from Buckley and Vidal on the incident. Buckley's essay "On Experiencing Gore Vidal" was published in the August 1969 issue. In September, Vidal responded with his own essay, "A Distasteful Encounter with William F. Buckley". In it Vidal strongly implied that, in 1944, Buckley's unnamed siblings and possibly Buckley had vandalized a Protestant church in their Sharon, Connecticut, hometown after the pastor's wife sold a house to a Jewish family. He also implied that Buckley was homosexual and a "racist, antiblack, anti-Semitic and a pro-crypto Nazi." Buckley sued Vidal and Esquire for libel; Vidal countersued Buckley for libel, citing Buckley's characterization of Vidal's novel Myra Breckenridge as pornography. After Buckley received an out-of-court settlement from Esquire, he dropped the suit against Vidal. Both cases were dropped, with Buckley settling for court costs paid by Esquire, which had published the piece, while Vidal, who did not sue the magazine, absorbed his own court costs. Neither paid the other compensation. Buckley also received an editorial apology from Esquire as part of the settlement.

The feud was reopened in 2003 when Esquire republished the original Vidal essay as part of a collection titled Esquire's Big Book of Great Writing. After further litigation, Esquire agreed to pay $65,000 to Buckley and his attorneys, to destroy every remaining copy of the book that included Vidal's essay, to furnish Buckley's 1969 essay to anyone who asked for it, and to publish an open letter stating that Esquire's current management was "not aware of the history of this litigation and greatly [regretted] the re-publication of the libels" in the 2003 collection.

Buckley maintained a philosophical antipathy toward Vidal's other , Norman Mailer, calling him "almost unique in his search for notoriety and absolutely unequalled in his co-existence with it." Meanwhile, Mailer called Buckley a "second-rate intellect incapable of entertaining two serious thoughts in a row." After Mailer's 2007 death, Buckley wrote warmly about their personal acquaintance.

Associations with liberal politicians
Buckley became a close friend of liberal Democratic activist Allard K. Lowenstein. He featured Lowenstein on numerous Firing Line programs, publicly endorsed his candidacies for Congress, and delivered a eulogy at his funeral.

Buckley was also a friend of economist John Kenneth Galbraith and former senator and presidential candidate George McGovern, both of whom he frequently featured or debated on Firing Line and college campuses. He and Galbraith occasionally appeared on The Today Show, where host Frank McGee would introduce them and then step aside and defer to their verbal thrusts and parries.

Amnesty International
In the late 1960s, Buckley joined the board of directors of Amnesty International USA. He resigned in January 1978 in protest over the organization's stance against capital punishment as expressed in its Stockholm Declaration of 1977, which he said would lead to the "inevitable sectarianization of the amnesty movement".

Political views

Political candidates 
In 1963–64, Buckley mobilized support for the candidacy of Arizona Senator Barry Goldwater, first for the Republican nomination against New York Governor Nelson Rockefeller and then for the presidency. Buckley used National Review as a forum for mobilizing support for Goldwater.In July 1971, Buckley assembled a group of conservatives to discuss some of Richard Nixon's domestic and foreign policies that the group opposed. In August 1969, Nixon had proposed and later attempted to enact the Family Assistance Plan (FAP), welfare legislation that would establish a national income floor of $1,600 per year for a family of four.   On the international front he negotiated talks with the Soviet Union and initiated relations with China, which Buckley, as a hawk and anti-communist, opposed. The group, known as the Manhattan Twelve, included National Review's publisher William A. Rusher and editors James Burnham and Frank Meyer. Other organizations represented were the newspaper Human Events, The Conservative Book Club, Young Americans for Freedom, and the American Conservative Union. On July 28, 1971, they published a letter announcing that they would no longer support Nixon. The letter said, "In consideration of his record, the undersigned, who have heretofore generally supported the Nixon Administration, have resolved to suspend our support of the Administration." Nonetheless, in 1973, the Nixon Administration appointed Buckley as a delegate to the United Nations, about which Buckley later wrote a book.

In 1973, Buckley supported Ronald Reagan's presidential campaign against sitting President Gerald Ford and expressed disappointment at Reagan's narrow loss to Ford. In 1981, Buckley informed President-elect Reagan that he would decline any official position offered to him. Reagan jokingly replied that was too bad, because he had wanted to make Buckley ambassador to (then Soviet-occupied) Afghanistan. Buckley later wrote, "When Ronald Reagan offered me the ambassadorship to Afghanistan, I said, 'Yes, but only if you give me fifteen divisions of bodyguards'."

Race and segregation 

In the 1950s and early 1960s, Buckley opposed federal civil rights legislation and expressed support for continued racial segregation in the South. In Freedom Is Not Enough: The Opening of the American Workplace, author Nancy MacLean states that National Review made James J. Kilpatrick—a prominent supporter of segregation in the South—"its voice on the civil rights movement and the Constitution, as Buckley and Kilpatrick united North and South in a shared vision for the nation that included upholding white supremacy". In the August 24, 1957, issue of National Review, Buckley's editorial "Why the South Must Prevail" spoke out explicitly in favor of temporary segregation in the South until "long term equality could be achieved". Buckley opined that temporary segregation in the South was necessary at the time because the black population lacked the education, economic, and cultural development to make racial equality possible. Buckley claimed that the white South had "the right to impose superior mores for whatever period it takes to effect a genuine cultural equality between the races". Buckley said white Southerners were "entitled" to disenfranchise black voters "because, for the time being, it is the advanced race." Buckley characterized Blacks as distinctly ignorant: "The great majority of the Negroes of the South who do not vote do not care to vote, and would not know for what to vote if they could." Two weeks after that editorial was published, another prominent conservative writer, L. Brent Bozell Jr. (Buckley's brother-in-law), wrote in the National Review: "This magazine has expressed views on the racial question that I consider dead wrong, and capable of doing great hurt to the promotion of conservative causes. There is a law involved, and a Constitution, and the editorial gives White Southerners leave to violate them both in order to keep the Negro politically impotent."

Buckley visited South Africa in the 1960s on several paid fact-finding missions in which he distributed publications that supported the South African government's policy of apartheid. On January 15, 1963, the day after George Wallace, the white supremacist governor of Alabama, made his "Segregation Forever" inaugural address, Buckley published a feature essay in National Review on his recent "South African Fortnight", concluding it with these words concerning apartheid: "I know it is a sincere people's effort to fashion the land of peace they want so badly." In his report, Buckley tried to define apartheid and came up with four axioms on which the policy stands, the fourth being "The notion that the Bantu could participate in power on equal terms with the whites is the worst kind of ideological and social romance". After publishing this defense of the Henrik Verwoerd government, Buckley wrote that he was "bursting with pride" over the West German social critic Wilhelm Röpke's praise of the piece.

Politico indicates that during the administration of Lyndon B. Johnson, Buckley's writing grew more accommodating toward the civil rights movement. In his columns, he "ridiculed practices designed to keep African Americans off the voter registration rolls", "condemned proprietors of commercial establishments who declined service to African Americans in violation of the recently enacted 1964 Civil Rights Act", and showed "little patience" for "Southern politicians who incited racial violence and race-baited in their campaigns". According to Politico, the turning point for Buckley was when white supremacists set off a bomb in a Birmingham church on September 15, 1963, which resulted in the deaths of four African American girls. A biographer said that Buckley privately wept about it when he found out about the incident.

But he disagreed with the concept of structural racism and placed a large amount of blame for lack of economic growth on the black community itself, most prominently during a highly publicized 1965 debate at the Cambridge Union with African-American writer James Baldwin, in which Baldwin carried the floor vote 544 to 164. In the late 1960s, Buckley disagreed with segregationist George Wallace of Alabama, debating against Wallace's segregationist platform on a January 1968 episode of Firing Line.

Buckley later said he wished National Review had been more supportive of civil rights legislation in the 1960s. He grew to admire Martin Luther King Jr. and supported the creation of Martin Luther King Jr. Day. In 2004, Buckley told Time, "I once believed we could evolve our way up from Jim Crow. I was wrong. Federal intervention was necessary." The same year, he endeavored to clarify his earlier comments on race, saying: "[T]he point I made about white cultural supremacy was sociological." Buckley also linked his usage of the word advancement to its usage in the name NAACP, saying that "[the] call for the 'advancement' of colored people presupposes they are behind. Which they were, in 1958, by any standards of measurement."

Anti-Semitism 
During the 1950s, Buckley worked to remove anti-Semitism from the conservative movement and barred anti-Semites from working for National Review. 

When Norman Podhoretz demanded that the conservative movement banish paleoconservative columnists Patrick Buchanan and Joseph Sobran, who, according to cultural critic Jeffrey Hart, had promulgated a "a neoisolationist nativism tinged with anti-Semitism", Buckley would have none of it, and wrote that Buchanan and Sobran (a colleague of Buckley and formerly a senior editor of National Review) were not anti-Semitic but anti-Israel. 

In 1991, Buckley wrote a 40,000-word article denouncing Buchanan. He wrote, "I find it impossible to defend Pat Buchanan against the charge that what he did and said during the period under examination amounted to anti-Semitism", but concluded: "If you ask, do I think Pat Buchanan is an anti-Semite, my answer is he is not one. But I think he's said some anti-Semitic things".

Conservative Roger Scruton wrote: "Buckley used the pages of the National Review to
distance conservatism from anti-Semitism, and from any other kind of racial stereotyping. The important goal, for him, was to establish a believable stance towards the modern world, in which all Americans, whatever their race or background, could be included, and which would uphold the religious and social traditions of the American people, as well as the institutions of government as the Founders had conceived them".

Foreign policy 
Buckley's opposition to communism extended to support for the overthrow and replacement of leftist governments by nondemocratic forces. Buckley admired Spanish dictator General Francisco Franco, who led the rightist military rebellion in its military defeat of the Spanish Republic, and praised him effusively in his magazine, National Review. In his 1957 "Letter From Spain", Buckley called Franco "an authentic national hero", who "above others" had the qualities needed to wrest Spain from "the hands of the visionaries, ideologues, Marxists and nihilists", i.e., the country's democratically elected government. He supported the military dictatorship of General Augusto Pinochet, who led the 1973 coup that overthrew Chilean president Salvador Allende's democratically elected Marxist government; Buckley called Allende "a president who was defiling the Chilean constitution and waving proudly the banner of his friend and idol, Fidel Castro." In 2020, the Columbia Journalism Review uncovered documents that implicated Buckley in a media campaign by the Argentina military junta promoting the regime's image while covering up the Dirty War.

Regarding the War in Iraq, Buckley stated, "The reality of the situation is that missions abroad to effect regime change in countries without a bill of rights or democratic tradition are terribly arduous." He added: "This isn't to say that the Iraq war is wrong, or that history will judge it to be wrong. But it is absolutely to say that conservatism implies a certain submission to reality; and this war has an unrealistic frank and is being conscripted by events." In a February 2006 column published at National Review Online and distributed by Universal Press Syndicate, Buckley wrote, "One cannot doubt that the American objective in Iraq has failed" and "it's important that we acknowledge in the inner councils of state that [the war] has failed, so that we should look for opportunities to cope with that failure."

Marijuana 
Buckley supported the legalization of marijuana and some other drug legalization as early as his 1965 candidacy for mayor of New York City. But in 1972, he said that while he supported removing criminal penalties for using marijuana, he also supported cracking down on trafficking marijuana. Buckley wrote a pro-marijuana-legalization piece for National Review in 2004 in which he called for conservatives to change their views on legalization, writing, "We're not going to find someone running for president who advocates reform of those laws. What is required is a genuine republican groundswell. It is happening, but ever so gradually. Two of every five Americans ... believe 'the government should treat marijuana more or less the same way it treats alcohol: It should regulate it, control it, tax it, and make it illegal only for children.

Gay rights 
Buckley took a middle course on the issues of gay rights and sexual ethics: He strongly opposed gay marriage, but supported the legalization of homosexual relations. 

In a March 18, 1986, New York Times op-ed, Buckley addressed the AIDS epidemic. Calling it "a fact" that AIDS is "the special curse of the homosexual", he argued that people infected with HIV should marry only if they agreed to sterilization and that universal testing—led by insurance companies, not the government—should be mandatory. Most controversially, he wrote: "Everyone detected with AIDS should be tattooed in the upper forearm, to protect common-needle users, and on the buttocks, to prevent the victimization of other homosexuals." The piece led to much criticism; some gay activists advocated boycotting Patricia Buckley's fund-raising efforts for AIDS. William Buckley later backtracked from the piece, but in 2004 he told The New York Times Magazine: "If the protocol had been accepted, many who caught the infection unguardedly would be alive. Probably over a million."

Spy novelist
In 1975, Buckley recounted being inspired to write a spy novel by Frederick Forsyth's The Day of the Jackal: "If I were to write a book of fiction, I'd like to have a whack at something of that nature." He went on to explain that he was determined to avoid the moral ambiguity of Graham Greene and John le Carré. Buckley wrote the 1976 spy novel Saving the Queen, featuring Blackford Oakes as a rule-bound CIA agent, based in part on his own CIA experiences. Over the next 30 years, he would write another ten novels featuring Oakes. New York Times critic Charlie Rubin wrote that the series "at its best, evokes John O'Hara in its precise sense of place amid simmering class hierarchies". Stained Glass, second in the series, won a 1980 National Book Award in the one-year category "Mystery (paperback)".

Buckley was particularly concerned about the view that what the CIA and the KGB were doing was morally equivalent. He wrote in his memoirs, "To say that the CIA and the KGB engage in similar practices is the equivalent of saying that the man who pushes an old lady into the path of a hurtling bus is not to be distinguished from the man who pushes an old lady out of the path of a hurtling bus: on the grounds that, after all, in both cases someone is pushing old ladies around."

Buckley began writing on computers in 1982, starting with a Zenith Z-89. According to his son, Buckley developed an almost fanatical loyalty to WordStar, installing it on every new PC he got despite its growing obsolescence over the years. Buckley used it to write his last novel, and when asked why he continued using something so outdated, he answered "They say there's better software, but they also say there's better alphabets."

Later career

In 1988, Buckley helped defeat liberal Republican Senator Lowell Weicker in Connecticut. Buckley organized a committee to campaign against Weicker and endorsed his Democratic opponent, Connecticut Attorney General Joseph Lieberman.

In 1991, Buckley received the Presidential Medal of Freedom from President George H. W. Bush. Upon turning 65 in 1990, he retired from the day-to-day running of the National Review. He relinquished his controlling shares of National Review in June 2004 to a pre-selected board of trustees. The following month, he published the memoir Miles Gone By. Buckley continued to write his syndicated newspaper column, as well as opinion pieces for National Review magazine and National Review Online. He remained the ultimate source of authority at the magazine and also conducted lectures and gave interviews.

Views on modern-day conservatism
Buckley criticized certain aspects of policy within the modern conservative movement. Of George W. Bush's presidency, he said, "If you had a European prime minister who experienced what we've experienced it would be expected that he would retire or resign."

According to Jeffrey Hart, writing in The American Conservative, Buckley had a "tragic" view of the Iraq war: he "saw it as a disaster and thought that the conservative movement he had created had in effect committed intellectual suicide by failing to maintain critical distance from the Bush administration .... At the end of his life, Buckley believed the movement he made had destroyed itself by supporting the war in Iraq." Regarding the Iraq War troop surge of 2007, however, it was noted by the editors of National Review that: "Buckley initially opposed the surge, but after seeing its early success believed it deserved more time to work."

In his December 3, 2007, column, shortly after his wife's death, which he attributed, at least in part, to her smoking, Buckley seemed to advocate banning tobacco use in America. Buckley wrote articles for Playboy, despite criticizing the magazine and its philosophy.
About neoconservatives, he said in 2004: "I think those I know, which is most of them, are bright, informed and idealistic, but that they simply overrate the reach of U.S. power and influence."

Death and legacy
Buckley suffered from emphysema and diabetes in his later years. In a December 2007 column, he commented on the cause of his emphysema, citing his lifelong habit of smoking tobacco, despite endorsing a legal ban of it. On February 27, 2008, he died from a heart attack at his home in Stamford, Connecticut, at the age of 82. Initially, it was reported that he was found dead at his desk in his study, a converted garage; his son, Christopher Buckley, said, "He died with his boots on, after a lifetime of riding pretty tall in the saddle." But in his 2009 book Losing Mum and Pup: A Memoir, he admitted that this account was a slight embellishment on his part: while his father died in his study, he was found lying on the floor. Buckley was buried at the Saint Bernard Cemetery in Sharon, Connecticut, next to his wife, Patricia.

Notable members of the Republican political establishment paying tribute to Buckley included President George W. Bush, former Speaker of the House of Representatives Newt Gingrich, and former First Lady Nancy Reagan. Bush said of Buckley, "He influenced a lot of people, including me. He captured the imagination of a lot of people." Gingrich added, "Bill Buckley became the indispensable intellectual advocate from whose energy, intelligence, wit, and enthusiasm the best of modern conservatism drew its inspiration and encouragement ... Buckley began what led to Senator Barry Goldwater and his Conscience of a Conservative that led to the seizing of power by the conservatives from the moderate establishment within the Republican Party. From that emerged Ronald Reagan." Reagan's widow, Nancy, commented, "Ronnie valued Bill's counsel throughout his political life, and after Ronnie died, Bill and Pat were there for me in so many ways." House Minority Whip Roy Blunt stated that "William F. Buckley was more than a journalist or commentator. He was the indisputable leader of the conservative movement that laid the groundwork for the Reagan Revolution. Every Republican owes him a debt of gratitude for his tireless efforts on behalf of our party and nation."

Various organizations have awards and honors named after Buckley. The Intercollegiate Studies Institute awards the William F. Buckley Award for Outstanding Campus Journalism.

Language and idiolect
Buckley was well known for his command of language. He came late to formal instruction in English, not learning it until he was seven years old and having earlier learned Spanish and French. Michelle Tsai in Slate says that he spoke English with an idiosyncratic accent: something between an old-fashioned, upper-class Mid-Atlantic accent, and British Received Pronunciation, yet with a Southern drawl. Sociologist Patricia Leavy called it "Buckley's High Church, mid-Atlantic accent (taught to actors in the Hollywood studios of the 1930s and 1940s) that was curdled by an ascendant tincture of Southern drawl that softened somewhat the supercilious inflection that very likely was spawned during his education at Yale".

Professor of political science Gerald L. Houseman wrote that Buckley's vaunted love of language did not ensure the quality of his writing, and criticized some of Buckley's work for "inappropriate metaphors and inelegant syntax" and for his habit of interjecting in his quotations of others parenthetical references to the "temperament or morals" of those being quoted.

Rhetorical style 
On Firing Line, Buckley had a reputation for being polite to his guests. But he also occasionally softly teased his guests if they were friends. Sometimes during heated debates, as with Noam Chomsky and Gore Vidal, Buckley became less polite.

Epstein (1972) says that liberals were especially fascinated by Buckley, and often wanted to debate him, in part because his ideas resembled their own, for Buckley typically formulated his arguments in reaction to left-liberal opinion, rather than being founded on conservative principles that were alien to the liberals.

Appel (1992) argues from rhetorical theory that Buckley's essays are often written in "low" burlesque in the manner of Samuel Butler's satirical poem "Hudibras". Considered as drama, such discourse features black-and-white disorder, a guilt-mongering logician, distorted clownish opponents, limited scapegoating, and a self-serving redemption.

Lee (2008) contends that Buckley introduced a new rhetorical style that conservatives often tried to emulate. The "gladiatorial style", as Lee calls it, is flashy and combative, filled with sound bites, and leads to inflammatory drama. As conservatives encountered Buckley's arguments about government, liberalism and markets, the theatrical appeal of Buckley's gladiatorial style inspired conservative imitators, becoming one of the principal templates for conservative rhetoric.

Nathan J. Robinson, writing in Current Affairs about Buckley's role as a major conservative intellectual, says, "Buckley created a template for conservative intellectualism that is still used today: be glib, confident, and a good debater, throw in a dash of wit and some references to the Classics. Do it all with a self-satisfied smile, and the validity or invalidity of your underlying arguments will cease to be a matter of serious discussion."

In popular culture
For the 1991 film Hook, Dustin Hoffman based his vocal mannerisms as Captain Hook on Buckley.

In the 1992 film Aladdin, the Genie (voiced by Robin Williams) impersonates Buckley in two scenes.

The 2016 film X-Men: Apocalypse briefly shows footage of Buckley on a TV news clip.

Buckley is a major character in James Graham's 2021 play Best of Enemies.

Works

Explanatory notes

References

Citations

Works cited

Further reading

 
 Dunn, Betty. "The Buckleys of Great Elm." Life, Vol. 69, No. 25, December 18, 1970, pp. 34–45.
 Farber, David. The Rise and Fall of Modern American Conservatism: A Short History (2010) pp. 39–76
 Gottfried, Paul (1993). The Conservative Movement. 
 
 Lee, Michael J. "WFB: The Gladiatorial Style and the Politics of Provocation", Rhetoric and Public Affairs, Summer 2010, Vol. 13, Issue 2, pp. 43–76
 Miller, David (1990). Chairman Bill: A Biography of William F. Buckley Jr.. New York
 Nash, George H. The Conservative Intellectual Movement in America Since 1945 (2006)
 
 Sarchett, Barry W. "Unreading the Spy Thriller: The Example of William F. Buckley Jr.", Journal of Popular Culture, Fall 1992, Vol. 26 Issue 2, pp. 127–139, theoretical literary analysis

External links
 
 
 The William F. Buckley, Jr. Program at Yale University
 William F. Buckley, Jr., papers (MS 576) Manuscripts and Archives, Yale University Library
 Buckley Online , a complete guide to the writings William F. Buckley at Hillsdale College
 William F. Buckley at Library of Congress Authorities – with 109 catalog records
 William F. Buckley's FBI files, hosted at the Internet Archive: part 1, part 2
 Historic debate between James Baldwin and William F. Buckley Jr. at Cambridge University (1965) on the question: "Is the American Dream at the expense of the American Negro?"

 
1925 births
2008 deaths
20th-century American novelists
20th-century Roman Catholics
21st-century American non-fiction writers
21st-century American novelists
21st-century Roman Catholics
Activists from New York (state)
United States Army personnel of World War II
American anti-communists
American columnists
American harpsichordists
American libertarians
American magazine founders
American male non-fiction writers
American male novelists
American people of Canadian descent
American people of Irish descent
American people of Swiss-German descent
American political activists
American political commentators
American political writers
American Roman Catholic religious writers
American sailors
American segregationists
American spies
American spy fiction writers
American traditionalist Catholics
American travel writers
American writers of Irish descent
Buckley family
Catholics from Connecticut
Catholics from New York (state)
Catholic libertarians
Connecticut Republicans
Conservative Party of New York State politicians
Critics of Objectivism (Ayn Rand)
Deaths from diabetes
Deaths from emphysema
American drug policy reform activists
Knights of Malta
Manhattan Institute for Policy Research
National Book Award winners
National Review people
New Right (United States)
New York (state) Republicans
Novelists from Connecticut
Novelists from New York (state)
People from the Upper East Side
People of the Central Intelligence Agency
Politicians from New York City
Presidential Medal of Freedom recipients
Skull and Bones Society
Traditionalist Catholic writers
United States Army officers
Writers from Manhattan
Writers from Stamford, Connecticut
Yale University alumni
20th-century classical musicians
20th-century American male writers
21st-century American male writers
Member of the Mont Pelerin Society